Uncinia debilior is a flowering plant in the sedge family. The specific epithet derives from the Latin  ("weak" or "feeble"), with reference to the species having weaker culms than Uncinia compacta.

Description
It is a tufted Perennial plant, with filiform culms, growing to 15–50 cm in height. The grasslike leaves are 5–10 cm longer than the culms and 0.5–1 mm wide. The slender inflorescence is 4–7 cm long, with the lowermost 20–30 flowers female, and the uppermost 5–10 male.

Distribution and habitat
The sedge is endemic to Australia's subtropical Lord Howe Island in the Tasman Sea. It occurs in low forest on and around the summits of Mount Lidgbird and Mount Gower at the southern end of the island.

References

debilior
Endemic flora of Lord Howe Island
Plants described in 1874
Poales of Australia
Taxa named by Ferdinand von Mueller